Upogebia deltaura is a species of mud lobster from the Atlantic Ocean and Mediterranean Sea.

Description
It is often confused with other species which it closely resembles, such as Upogebia stellata, which has additional ocular spines and a narrower abdomen. The mouthparts are densely setose, which helps to filter particles out of the water.

Distribution
Upogebia deltaura is found in the eastern Atlantic from Sognefjord, Norway to Spain, and throughout the Mediterranean Sea as well as in the Black Sea. It may also extend as far as Togo, West Africa, but possible confusion with other taxa makes this difficult to assess.

Ecology
Upogebia deltaura lives in burrows at up to  depth, and will make use of burrows dug by other animals. U. deltaura is the most abundant large crustacean and the deepest burrowing (up to ) large animal in Scottish maerl beds, and will reconstruct its burrow after disturbance by storms or trawling.

References

Thalassinidea
Crustaceans of the Atlantic Ocean
Fauna of the Black Sea
Fauna of the Mediterranean Sea
Crustaceans described in 1815
Taxa named by William Elford Leach